The Butler interception was an American football play made in Super Bowl XLIX involving both Seattle Seahawks quarterback Russell Wilson, and cornerback Malcolm Butler of the New England Patriots. Considered by many to be one of the worst offensive play calls in the history of the Super Bowl, and one of the best defensive calls, Wilson decided to pass the ball as opposed to handing the ball off to Marshawn Lynch, instead attempting a pass to Ricardo Lockette, which was intercepted by Butler. Had Wilson handed it off to Lynch, it is highly speculated that Seattle would have not only won the Super Bowl, but become the first team to win back to back Super Bowls since the Patriots' back to back victories in Super Bowl XXXVIII and Super Bowl XXXIX.

Background

During the 2014 NFL offseason, the Patriots picked up Butler as an undrafted free agent out of the University of West Alabama. Wilson was drafted by the Seahawks in the third round of the 2012 NFL Draft. During the 2014 NFL season, the Patriots managed to get a conference best 13 and 3 record, as did the Seahawks in their conference. As both won their respective playoff games, they finally met in Super Bowl XLIX.

The play
On February 1, 2015, Butler and the Patriots appeared in Super Bowl XLIX against the defending champion Seattle Seahawks and Butler began the game as the fifth cornerback on the Patriots’ depth chart. Butler entered the game in the third quarter at nickelback after Kyle Arrington struggled to cover Chris Matthews.

Two plays later, with 20 seconds remaining and the Seahawks in position to score on the Patriots' one-yard line, Butler intercepted a pass attempt to wide receiver Ricardo Lockette at the goal line, returning possession to the Patriots and maintaining the Patriots' 28–24 lead. Butler said that he had guessed correctly that Wilson would throw to Lockette, having read the Seahawks two-receiver stack formation.  Butler gave credit to Patriots defensive coordinator Matt Patricia for preparing players well for the game. The interception was the first of Butler's NFL career, and is considered to be one of, if not the most influential Super Bowl defensive play.

Reactions 
Seattle offensive coordinator Darrell Bevell acknowledged making the call, but also remarked that Lockette could have been more aggressive on the play. Wilson said the play was a "good call", and lamented throwing the interception and "not making that play." Carroll, though, said the last play was "all my fault", and called Bevell "crucially important to our future." The head coach added that Seattle would have run the ball on a subsequent play, as well that "we don't ever call a play thinking we might throw an interception." Butler's interception was the only one against all 109 pass attempts during the 2014 NFL season from the 1-yard line.

References

Super Bowl plays
American football incidents
New England Patriots postseason
Seattle Seahawks postseason
2014 National Football League season
February 2015 sports events in the United States
2015 in sports in Arizona